Milliken is a surname, and may refer to:

 Angie Milliken, Australian actress
 Benjamin Milliken,  founder of Ellsworth, Maine and American Loyalist
 Benjamin Milliken II, United Empire Loyalist, Major in York Militia during 1837 Upper Canada Rebellion
 Bob Milliken, American baseball pitcher
 Carl E. Milliken, Republican and Progressive Party politician and early figure in the motion picture industry
 Isaac Lawrence Milliken, mayor of Chicago from 1854 to 1855
 James Milliken (academic administrator) (born 1957), chancellor of the University of Texas System
 James B. Milliken, American judge
 James T. Milliken (1882–1952), American businessman and Michigan State Senator
 James W. Milliken (1848–1908), American businessman, mayor, and Michigan State Senator
 Jessie Milliken (1877–1951), American botanist
 Nicholas Milliken, Canadian politician
 Norman Milliken, founder of Milliken, Ontario and American Loyalist
 Peter Milliken, former Speaker of the House of Commons of Canada
 Roger Milliken, textile heir  
 Seth L. Milliken, Maine politician
 William Milliken (1922–2019), Michigan Governor 
 William H. Milliken Jr., Pennsylvania politician
 William F. Milliken Jr., aircraft and automotive engineer

See also
 Millikan (disambiguation)
 Milken (disambiguation)
 Millikin (disambiguation)